Matthew A. Beaton is an American political figure and business executive.

Career
In May, 2019, he became senior vice president of renewable energy and emerging technology at TRC Companies. His most recent public office was serving as the Secretary of the Massachusetts Executive Office of Energy and Environmental Affairs from 2015 to 2019. He previously elected in the Massachusetts House of Representatives from 2011 to 2015. He is a Shrewsbury resident and a member of the Republican Party. Beaton graduated from St. John's High School in Shrewsbury in 1996. Beaton represented the United States in the 2001 World Rowing Championships in Lucerne,  Switzerland in the men's lightweight double.

References

Living people
Republican Party members of the Massachusetts House of Representatives
People from Shrewsbury, Massachusetts
State cabinet secretaries of Massachusetts
1978 births